António Joaquim Fernandes (27 November 1951 – 15 September 2019), known as Roberto Leal, was a Portuguese singer, songwriter and actor. He sold more than 17 million albums, and received 30 golden records and 5 platinum records.

Biography
Leal was born in Macedo de Cavaleiros municipality, Bragança District, in northeast Portugal. In 1962 his family moved to Brazil.

Roberto Leal wrote and produced most of his songs.  Some of Leal's best known songs are: Bate o Pé, Clareou, O Vinho de Meu Amor, and Marrabenta. In 2007 and 2010 he released albums in both Portuguese and Mirandese. Leal had a dynamic vocal range and was a great dancer.

Leal had a wife Márcia Lúcia and three children.

Illness and death
In January 2019, Leal stated he had been fighting cancer for the past two years and had lost part of his sight due to two cataracts.

Roberto Leal died at age 67 on 15 September 2019 of kidney failure, following complications from an allergic reaction during his fight against cancer. He had been in hospital for five days in the semi-intensive unit of the Samaritano Hospital de São Paulo.

Discography

References

External links 
Official website 

1951 births
2019 deaths
People from Bragança District
20th-century Brazilian male singers
20th-century Brazilian singers
21st-century Brazilian male singers
21st-century Brazilian singers
Portuguese emigrants to Brazil
People with acquired Brazilian citizenship
Mirandese language
Deaths from skin cancer